Electricity and Magnetism is a standard textbook in electromagnetism originally written by Nobel laureate Edward Mills Purcell in 1963. Along with David Griffiths' Introduction to Electrodynamics, the book is one of the most widely adopted undergraduate textbooks in electromagnetism. A Sputnik-era project funded by an National Science Foundation grant, the book is influential for its use of relativity in the presentation of the subject at the undergraduate level. In 1999 , it was noted by Norman Foster Ramsey Jr., that the book was widely adopted and has many foreign translations. 

The 1965 edition, now supposed to be freely available due to a condition of the federal grant, was originally published as a volume of the Berkeley Physics Course. (See below for more on the legal situation.) In 2013, third edition was updated to SI units by David J. Morin for Cambridge University Press.

Background
The Berkeley Series was influenced by MIT’s Physical Science Study Committee that was formed shortly before Sputnik was launched in 1956. The satellite could be seen from rooftops at MIT with times published in the local Boston newspapers. The space race affair is said to have caused a shake-up in the US scientific establishment and it led to new approaches to science education in the US.

Contents (3rd edition)
 
 Electrostatics: charges and fields
 The electric potential
 Electric fields around conductors
 Electric currents
 The fields of moving charges
 The magnetic field
 Electromagnetic induction
 Alternating-current circuits
 Maxwell's equations and electromagnetic waves
 Electric fields in matter
 Magnetic fields in matter

Reception

In 1966, Benjamin F. Bayman reviewed the first edition calling the book as a "beautiful book on electricity and magnetism", saying that he read the book with "great pleasure and profit". Bayman disputes the readability of the book for college sophomores, but goes on to praise the book's treatment of the subject as "very careful, very physical, and for the most part very clear" and that "in a few guiding sentences, he points the student towards the heart of the matter". Bayman singles out the chapters on electric and magnetic fields in matter.

In 1998, a review of the second edition, the reviewer admits to using the first edition the previous year in an accelerated course for engineers and physics majors and states it was "the best introductory textbook I have seen", stating it "has not aged". The reviewer notes that the main problem with the book is the restrictions around the Berkeley Physics Series and it lacks references to wave phenomena, issues that were fixed in the new edition according to the review, the "result is spectacular".

In 1999, Norman Foster Ramsey Jr. wrote, in his obituary for Purcell, that it was an "excellent introductory textbook". In 2013, a review of Andrew Zangwill's Electrodynamics in Physics Today, Roy Schwitters states that he encourages undergraduates to get the third edition of this book In 2013, in Physics Today, Jermey N. A. Mathews called it one of five books that stood out, remarking that "[c]learly, Purcell's E&M matures slowly."

In 2012, a review of a second edition acknowledged that the book's foremost criticism its lack of solutions to the problems given at the end of each chapter. The reviewer states that this problem was exacerbated by not including many calculation examples throughout the text. The book's use of cgs units rather than SI units was also mentioned as problematic. The review continues by saying "[d]espite the criticism, this text is very beautifully written and gives a well-structured and clear insight into the topic" and that it has "become some sort of standard" and "can be recommended to any student" for use in an introductory course of electromagnetism.

In 2013, in a review of the third edition Michael Belsley called the book "a welcome and significantly improved re-edition of what is arguably one of the finest undergraduate introductory textbooks on the subject...strongest aspect of the book" is its treatment of magnetism as a relativistic phenomenon. In 2013, Conquering the Physics GRE, third edition, said it to be "an extremely elegant introduction emphasizing physical concepts rather than mathematical formalism". In 2013, Sam Nolan called it "an excellent updated introduction to this classic 50 year old text". A third review of the book called it a "welcome update to the original".

Legal status
Because it was funded by the National Science Foundation, the original editions of the Berkeley Physics Series contained notices on their copyright pages stating that the books were to be available royalty-free after five years. The copyright page of the original 1965 edition of Electricity and Magnetism includes a notice stating that it is available for use by authors and publishers on a royalty-free basis after 1970. The authors got lump-sum payments but did not receive royalties. The copyright page of the 1965 edition says to obtain a royalty-free license from Education Development Center.
Copyright © 1963, 1964, 1965 by Education Development Center, Inc. (successor by merger to Education Services Incorporated).
...
Education Development Center, Inc., Newton, Massachusetts
...
The copyright owner will give permission for the use of the original work in the English language after January 1, 1975. For conditions of use, permission to use, and for other permissions, apply to the copyright owner.
— Tata McGraw-Hill edition

Education Development Center's copyright to the 1965 edition now belongs to Edward Mills Purcell's sons, Dennis W. Purcell (Harvard 1962) and Frank B. Purcell (Harvard 1965).

Benjamin Crowell, retired Fullerton College physics teacher, wrote that Cambridge University Press refused to forward to Crowell, copyright owner contact information, but has said they would forward to copyright owner Crowell's request. Benjamin Crowell wrote that this made it effectively impossible to obtain the royalty-free license promised under the original government contract, and that this uncertainty, makes an open-source version of the first edition in legal limbo.

The reporting of the Electricity and Magnetism Open Access book project refers to electronic versions of the royalty-free first edition currently available on the internet.

Original publication history

International editions

See also

 List of textbooks in electromagnetism

References

External links
 
 
 
 Purcell, Electricity and Magnetism, 1st edition - an unfinished, due to legal status, Open Access book project, in LaTeX format, depending on the royalty-free license

1965 non-fiction books
1985 non-fiction books
2013 non-fiction books
Electromagnetism
Physics textbooks
Undergraduate education